"My Baby Left Me" is a rhythm and blues song written by blues singer Arthur Crudup.

Original recording
It was first recorded by Crudup in Chicago on November 8, 1950, with Ransom Knowling on bass and Judge Riley on drums, and was released as a single on RCA Victor 22–0109.

Later versions
It gained further exposure in covers by Elvis Presley, who placed his version on the B-side to his 1956 single "I Want You, I Need You, I Love You"; by Wanda Jackson who often shared the same bill as Presley; by Creedence Clearwater Revival, who recorded it as a track on their 1970 album, Cosmo's Factory; by Buffy Sainte-Marie on her 1972 album Moonshot; and by John Lennon (incorrectly titled "Since My Baby Left Me"), recorded during the Rock 'n' Roll sessions in 1973, but first released posthumously on Menlove Ave. in 1986. It was included as a bonus track (still incorrectly titled) on the 2004 CD version of Rock 'n' Roll. It was also a No. 37 UK Singles Chart hit in 1964 for Dave Berry and the Cruisers. Elton John used a snippet of "My Baby Left Me" as part of a medley (along with a snippet of the Beatles' "Get Back") during his concert performance of "Burn Down the Mission" on his 17-11-70 live album.  Loggins and Messina also covered this song on their 1975 album, So Fine.

Slade version

"My Baby Left Me" was covered by the British rock band Slade in 1977 and released as a non-album single as a tribute to Elvis Presley, who died in August of that year. The Slade version merged "My Baby Left Me" with "That's All Right", another Crudup-penned track. "My Baby Left Me But That's Alright Mama" reached No. 32 in the UK and remained in the charts for four weeks.

Background
Returning to the UK from the United States in August 1976, Slade found themselves out-of-favour at the time of the UK's Punk rock explosion. The band's 1977 album Whatever Happened to Slade proved a commercial failure while their tour that spring had shown that they could no longer fill large venues. Although their April 1977 single "Burning in the Heat of Love" also failed to chart, the band returned to the Top 40 with "My Baby Left Me". Released in November 1977, it reached No. 32 and would be the band's last Top 40 single until 1981's "We'll Bring the House Down".

"My Baby Left Me" was recorded in August at Advision Studios in London. The band decided to record the song as a tribute to Elvis Presley following his death earlier that month. As guitarist Dave Hill was busy doing interviews in northern England, bassist Jim Lea played guitar on the recording. "My Baby Left Me" was released on 7" vinyl by Barn Records in the UK, Ireland, Belgium, France and Germany. The B-side, "O.H.M.S.", was exclusive to the single and would later appear on the band's 2007 compilation B-Sides.

A music video was filmed to promote the single, featuring the band performing on a stage. In the UK, the band performed the song on the music show Top of the Pops. In Germany, it was performed on the TV shows Disco and Rund.

Critical reception
Upon release, Record Mirror described the song as "real pleasant", but added: "I can remember a time when Slade records were vixen fearsome rather than pleasant". Sounds rated the single as the "Best Comeback Single", describing it as a "fabulous treatment" of the "bouncy, struttin' 12-bar blues number".

Track listing
7" Single
"My Baby Left Me/That's Alright Mama" - 2:23
"O.H.M.S." - 2:41

Personnel
Slade
Noddy Holder – lead vocals, guitar
Jim Lea – guitar, bass, backing vocals
Don Powell – drums

Additional personnel
Chas Chandler – producer
Gered Mankowitz – sleeve photography
Jo Mirowski – sleeve design

Charts

References

1950 songs
Elvis Presley songs
Blues songs
Creedence Clearwater Revival songs
1977 singles
Slade songs
Song recordings produced by Chas Chandler